Violent Delights + Violent Ends is an album by Samantha Scarlette, released on November 18, 2014.  The album was produced by Finnish Music producer Hiili Hiilesmaa. The majority of the album was recorded at Quad Studios in New York City in July 2014. The album, which was mastered by Ted Jensen at Sterling Sound, also features background vocals from Sarah Dash of Labelle, and a collaboration with Matt Deis of CKY (band).

Track listing

Personnel
 Samantha Scarlette – vocals (all songs), lead guitar ("Iron Maiden"), synth ("Iron Maiden")
 Sarah Dash – Background vocals on "These Violent Delights" & "Epitaphs Of Love"
 Hiili Hiilesmaa – production & drums on all tracks except for "Death Of A Dream: Farewell (Reprise)" & "Iron Maiden"
 Kalle Sundstrom – guitar & bass on all tracks except for "Death Of A Dream: Farewell (Reprise)" &  "Iron Maiden"
 Matt Deis - guitar, bass & percussion on "Death Of A Dream: Farewell (Reprise)"
 John Grey - drums, bass, rhythm guitar, and production on "Iron Maiden"
 Justin Salter - instrumental performance & production on "Fallen Star"

References

2014 albums
Samantha Scarlette albums